Perdita coreopsidis is a species of bee in the family Andrenidae. It is found in Central America and North America.

Subspecies
These four subspecies belong to the species Perdita coreopsidis:
 Perdita coreopsidis collaris Cockerell, 1916
 Perdita coreopsidis coreopsidis
 Perdita coreopsidis kansensis Timberlake, 1953
 Perdita coreopsidis obscurior Timberlake, 1953

References

Further reading

 
 

Andrenidae
Articles created by Qbugbot
Insects described in 1906